Jalan Tengku Mizan, Federal Route 65 (formerly Terengganu State Route T4), is a major highway in Kuala Nerus and Kuala Terengganu, Terengganu, Malaysia. The highway connects Bulatan, Kuala Nerus in the north to Bukit Besar, Kuala Terengganu in the south. It was named after Yang di-Pertuan Muda (Crown Prince) of Terengganu at that time, Tengku Mizan Zainal Abidin from 1979 to 1998 (now Sultan Mizan Zainal Abidin of Terengganu). It has been a toll-free highway since toll collection was abolished on 1999. The highway has a motorcycle lane. Landmarks along the highway include Sultan Mahmud Bridge and Terengganu Welcome Sign (Allah Peliharakanlah Terengganu).

List of interchanges

Highways in Malaysia
Kuala Nerus District